The non-marine molluscs of Mongolia are a part of the fauna of Mongolia. They include land and freshwater gastropods and freshwater bivalves.

Freshwater gastropods 

Valvatidae
 Valvata antiqua Morris, 1838
 Valvata brevicula Kozhov, 1936
 Valvata confusa Westerlund, 1897
 Valvata piscinalis (O. F. Müller, 1774)
 Valvata sibirica Middendorff, 1851

Lymnaeidae
 Galba sibirica (Westerlund, 1885)
 Ladislavella terebra (Westerlund, 1885)
 Lymnaea stagnalis (Linnaeus, 1758)
 Orientogalba hookeri (Reeve, 1850)
 Orientogalba viridis (Quoy et Gaimard, 1833)
 Radix auricularia (Linnaeus, 1758)
 Radix bactriana (Hutton, 1849)
 Radix balthica (Linnaeus, 1758)
 Radix intermedia (Lamarck, 1822)
 Radix lagotis (Schrank, 1803)
 Radix mongolica (Yen, 1939)
 Radix obliquata (Martens, 1864)
 Radix parapsilia Vinarski et Glöer, 2009
 Radix tumida (Held, 1836)
 Radix zazurnensis (Mozley, 1934)

Physidae
 Physa fontinalis (Linnaeus, 1758)
 Physa taslei Bourguignat, 1860
 Sibirenauta tuwaensis Starobogatov et Zatravkin in Starobogatov, Prozorova et Zatravkin, 1989

Planorbidae
 Armiger annandalei (Germain, 1918)
 Armiger crista (Linnaeus, 1758)
 Bathyomphalus contortus (Linnaeus, 1758)
 Choanomphalus mongolicus Kozhov, 1946
 Gyraulus chinensis (Dunker, 1848)
 Gyraulus infraliratus (Westerlund, 1876)
 Gyraulus kruglowiae (Johansen, 1937)
 Gyraulus sibiricus (Dunker, 1848)
 Gyraulus stroemi (Westerlund, 1881)
 Gyraulus terekholicus (Prozorova et Starobogatov, 1997)
 Helicorbis kozhovi Starobogatov et Streletzkaja, 1967
 Polypylis sibirica Starobogatov et Streletzkaja, 1967

Land gastropods

Freshwater bivalves

See also
List of non-marine molluscs of Russia
List of non-marine molluscs of China

References

M
Molluscs
Mongolia
Mongolia